The Vanj Range is a mountain range of Vanj district, Gorno-Badakhshan, Tajikistan.

Geography
It lies to the south of the Academy of Sciences Range, between the Darvaz Range to the north and the Yazgulem Range to the south. Running parallel to them, it separates the valleys of the Vanj River and the Yazgulyam River. The total glaciated area of the range is 164 km2.

Peaks
Its highest summit is glacier-covered High Yazgulem Peak (5,588 m). Other peaks are Vanchek Peak (5,428 m), Hauck Peak (5,092 m), Kuh-i Rau (4,964 m), Sokolov Peak (4,808 m) and Ku-i Zoh (4,664 m).

See also
List of mountains in Tajikistan
List of mountains of Uzbekistan

References

Gorno-Badakhshan Autonomous Region
Mountain ranges of Tajikistan
Pamir Mountains